Kjetil is a Norwegian masculine given name. It may refer to:

Kjetil Aleksander Lie (born 1980), Norwegian chess player, Norway's eighth International Grandmaster
Kjetil André Aamodt (born 1971), Norwegian former alpine ski racer
Kjetil Bang-Hansen (born 1940), Norwegian actor, dancer, stage producer and theatre director
Kjetil Bjørklund (born 1967), Norwegian politician for the Socialist Left Party
Kjetil Bjørlo (born 1968), Norwegian orienteering competitor
Kjetil Borch (born 1990), Norwegian rower
Kjetil Byfuglien (born 1977), Norwegian professional football defender
Kjetil Jansrud (born 1985), Norwegian alpine skier and Olympic gold medalist
Kjetil Løvvik (born 1972), retired Norwegian footballer
Kjetil Mårdalen (1925–1996), Norwegian Nordic combined skier
Kjetil Manheim, (born 1968), the drummer for the Norwegian black metal band Mayhem
Kjetil Mulelid (born 1991), Norwegian jazz musician
Kjetil Nilsen (born 1975), Norwegian football midfielder
Kjetil Norland (born 1978), retired Norwegian football striker
Kjetil Osvold (born 1961), retired Norwegian footballer
Kjetil Rekdal (born 1968), Norwegian football coach and a former footballer
Kjetil Ruthford Pedersen (born 1973), earlier Norwegian footballer
Kjetil Sælen (born 1969), Norwegian football referee from Bergen
Kjetil Siem (born 1960), Norwegian sports official
Kjetil Skogrand (born 1967), Norwegian historian and politician for the Labour Party
Kjetil Strand (born 1979), Norwegian handball player
Kjetil Trædal Thorsen, Norwegian architect
Kjetil Trøan, one of the sound designers on the 2007 Academy Award winner The Danish Poet
Kjetil Tronvoll (born 1966), a peace and conflict researcher based in Oslo
Kjetil Ulven (born 1967), Norwegian ski-orienteering competitor and world champion
Kjetil Undset (born 1970), Norwegian competition rower and Olympic medalist
Kjetil Wæhler (born 1976), Norwegian footballer
Kjetil-Vidar Haraldstad (born 1973), the Norwegian drummer in the black metal bands Satyricon and 1349

See also
 Ketil (name)
 Kettil (name)

Norwegian masculine given names